Stephen Anthony Jones (born 28 November 1962) is a Welsh former professional footballer who played as a forward. He made appearances in the English Football League for hometown club Wrexham and Crewe Alexandra. He also played in New Zealand for Dunedin City.

References

1962 births
Living people
Welsh footballers
Association football forwards
Wrexham A.F.C. players
Crewe Alexandra F.C. players
Dunedin City AFC players
English Football League players
Footballers from Wrexham